Stephen Eze (born 8 March 1994) is a Nigerian professional footballer who plays as a centre back for Queen's Park in the Scottish Championship.

Career

In Nigeria
Eze started his professional career at Lobi Stars. He played regularly during two seasons, before moving to Sunshine Stars in September 2014.

After two seasons with Sunshine, Eze joined Ifeanyi Ubah where he won Nigeria Super Cup in early 2017. On 9 November 2017, Eze joined Kano Pillars.

Lokomotiv Plovdiv
Two months later, on 18 January 2018, Eze joined Bulgarian First League club Lokomotiv Plovdiv, signing a two-year contract. On 18 February, he made his league debut for Lokomotiv, coming on as a substitute for Asen Georgiev against Pirin Blagoevgrad, . On 16 April 2019, Eze scored his first goal for Lokomotiv in a Bulgarian Cup match against Septemvri Sofia, which Lokomotiv won 4–0.

Tobol
On 21 January 2020, Eze joined Kazakhstan Premier League club FC Tobol. An injury sustained in a pre-season friendly match meant he never got to feature in an official game for the team, as he had to undergo an operation in Turkey. Eze parted ways with Tobol in July 2020.

Jamshedpur FC
On 10 September 2020, Eze joined Indian Super League side Jamshedpur. After his one year contract was completed, on the 1 July 2021, Eze left Jamshedpur FC and became a free agent.

NK Solin
On 17 February 2022, Eze joined Croatian First League club NK Solin. He made his debut coming off the bench in a 3-0 loss against NK Dugopolje.

Queen's Park
After a year with Croatian club NK Solin, Eze signed for Scottish club Queen's Park in August 2022.

International career
Eze was invited to play for the Nigera national team. He was named in the Super Eagles' 23-man A' team which played in the Caf CHAN 2016, led by coach Sunday Oliseh. Eze played all the group games, but the team was eliminated in the first round. His performances led to an invitation to the full Nigeria team. He was also in the A' team in the 2016 African Nations Championship where results improved, Nigeria progressing to the final before losing to the hosts Morocco.

In May 2018 he was named in the preliminary 30-man squad for the 2018 World Cup in Russia; however, he did not make the final 23.

Career statistics

Club

Honours
Ifeanyi Ubah
Nigeria Super Cup: 2017

Lokomotiv Plovdiv
Bulgarian Cup: 2018–19

References

External links
Player Profile at National-Football-Teams
Profile at Soccerway

Living people
1994 births
People from Makurdi
Association football central defenders
Nigerian footballers
Nigeria international footballers
Lobi Stars F.C. players
Sunshine Stars F.C. players
Ifeanyi Ubah F.C. players
Kano Pillars F.C. players
PFC Lokomotiv Plovdiv players
First Professional Football League (Bulgaria) players
Expatriate footballers in Bulgaria
Igbo sportspeople
Jamshedpur FC players
Indian Super League players
NK Solin players
Queen's Park F.C. players
Expatriate footballers in India
Expatriate footballers in Croatia
Expatriate footballers in Scotland
Nigerian expatriate footballers
Nigerian expatriate sportspeople in Bulgaria
Nigerian expatriate sportspeople in India
Nigerian expatriate sportspeople in Croatia
Nigerian expatriate sportspeople in Scotland
FC Tobol players
Nigerian expatriate sportspeople in Kazakhstan
Expatriate footballers in Kazakhstan
Nigeria A' international footballers
2016 African Nations Championship players
Scottish Professional Football League players
2018 African Nations Championship players